The Senate Square can refer to several squares depending on the city:
 Helsinki Senate Square, a square in Helsinki, Finland
 The Saint Petersburg Senate Square, a square in Saint Petersburg, Russia, formerly known as Decembrists Square
 The Moscow Senate Square, a square in Moscow between Kremlin Arsenal and Kremlin Senate
 The Largo do Senado, in Macau, China